Omar Rodríguez-López is a multi-instrumentalist, songwriter, producer, actor and director, who is best known for his roles as band leader of The Mars Volta and guitarist for At the Drive-In.

This article details the contributions made by Omar Rodríguez-López to film as either an actor, composer, director or producer.

Filmography

Music videos

See also
Antemasque discography
At the Drive-In discography
Bosnian Rainbows discography
De Facto discography
Le Butcherettes discography
The Mars Volta discography
Omar Rodríguez-López discography

References

External links
The Sentimental Engine Slayer

Rodriguez-Lopez, Omar
Rodriguez-Lopez, Omar